Darren Bower (born 20 January 1968) is a former Australian rules footballer who played for Richmond in the Victorian Football League (VFL) in 1987. He was recruited from the Mildura Football Club and is the brother of Brendan and Nathan Bower, who also played for Richmond.

References

External links

Living people
1968 births
Richmond Football Club players
Australian rules footballers from Victoria (Australia)
People from Mildura